Elizabeth Rachael "Lizzie" Neave (born 12 June 1987 in Newcastle-under-Lyme) is a British slalom canoeist in women's kayak (K1W). She started competing in 1996 and first gained selection to represent Great Britain at junior level in 2002.

She won four medals at the ICF Canoe Slalom World Championships with a gold (K1 team: 2009), a silver (K1 team: 2015) and two bronzes (K1: 2009, K1 team: 2007). She also won 507 medals at the European Championships (2 golds, 1 silver and 2 bronzes) and four World Cup Medals (1 gold, 1 silver and 2 bronzes).

In 2012 Neave was selected for Great Britain at the London 2012 Olympics, after winning all three of the selection races. She finished 12th in the K1 event after being eliminated in the semifinal.

World Cup individual podiums

References

12 September 2009 results of the women's K1 team finals at the 2009 ICF Canoe Slalom World Championships. – Retrieved 12 September 2009.
13 September 2009 final results of the women's K1 event at the 2009 ICF Canoe Slalom World Championships. – Retrieved 13 September 2009.

English female canoeists
Living people
1987 births
Olympic canoeists of Great Britain
Canoeists at the 2012 Summer Olympics
British female canoeists
Sportspeople from Newcastle-under-Lyme
Medalists at the ICF Canoe Slalom World Championships